Étiolles is a commune in the Essonne department in Île-de-France in northern France, twenty-seven kilometers southeast of Paris.

Inhabitants of Étiolles are known as Étiollais.

See also
Communes of the Essonne department

References

External links

Official website 

Mayors of Essonne Association 

Communes of Essonne